Kootenay West was a federal electoral district in British Columbia, Canada, that was represented in the House of Commons of Canada from 1917 to 1988.

This riding was created in 1914 from parts of Kootenay riding.

It was abolished in 1987 when it was merged into Kootenay West—Revelstoke riding.

Members of Parliament

Election results

See also 

 List of Canadian federal electoral districts
 Past Canadian electoral districts

External links
Riding history from the Library of Parliament

Former federal electoral districts of British Columbia